Placopsis (bullseye lichen) is a genus of lichenized fungi in the family Trapeliaceae.

Species
, Species Fungorum (via the Catalog of Life) accepts 29 species of Placopsis.
Placopsis ampliata 
Placopsis antarctica 
Placopsis aspicilioides 
Placopsis bicolor 
Placopsis brachyloba 
Placopsis campbelliana 
Placopsis centrifuga 
Placopsis clavifera 
Placopsis cribellans 
Placopsis dennanensis 
Placopsis durietziorum 
Placopsis elixii 
Placopsis erosa 
Placopsis fusciduloides 
Placopsis gelida 
Placopsis hertelii 
Placopsis illita 
Placopsis imshaugii 
Placopsis lambii 
Placopsis macrospora 
Placopsis murrayi 
Placopsis parellina 
Placopsis perrugosa 
Placopsis polycarpa 
Placopsis pruinosa 
Placopsis rhodocarpa 
Placopsis rhodophthalma 
Placopsis stellata 
Placopsis subcribellans 
Placopsis venosa

References

Baeomycetales
Lichen genera
Baeomycetales genera
Taxa named by William Nylander (botanist)
Taxa described in 1861